The Belarus national under-21 football team is the national under-21 football team of Belarus and is controlled by the Football Federation of Belarus. The team competed in the UEFA European Under-21 Championship, held every two years.

History
The team qualified for the final round of the UEFA European Under-21 Championship three times. In 2004 in Germany and 2009 in Sweden the team was unable to advance past group stage.

In 2011 at U21 Euro in Denmark they advanced to semifinal with only one win (against Iceland) and two losses (against Denmark and Switzerland) and having better 3-way head-to-head record against Iceland and Denmark (as all three teams had identical overall results). The team lost 1-3 to Spain. They defeated the Czech Republic 1–0 in the third-place match and qualified for the Men's Football Tournament at the 2012 Summer Olympics.

After the 2022 Russian invasion of Ukraine, UEFA banned Belarus from hosting international competitions.

European Championship record

UEFA U21 Euro 2023 qualification

Current squad 
The following players were called up for two friendly matches against Iran on 16 and 19 November 2022.

Caps and goals are correct as of 19 November 2022, after the match against Iran.

|-----
! colspan="9" bgcolor="B0D3FB" align="left" |
|----- bgcolor="#DFEDFD"

|-----
! colspan="9" bgcolor="B0D3FB" align="left" |
|----- bgcolor="#DFEDFD"

|-----
! colspan="9" bgcolor="B0D3FB" align="left" |
|----- bgcolor="#DFEDFD"

Recent call-up 
The following players were called up for U21 team during last 12 months:

|-----
! colspan="9" bgcolor="B0D3FB" align="left" |

|-----
! colspan="9" bgcolor="B0D3FB" align="left" |
|----- bgcolor="#DFEDFD"

|-----
! colspan="9" bgcolor="B0D3FB" align="left" |
|----- bgcolor="#DFEDFD"

|-----
! colspan="9" bgcolor="B0D3FB" align="left" |
|----- bgcolor="#DFEDFD"

See also
Belarus national football team
Belarus national under-23 football team
Belarus national under-19 football team
Belarus national under-17 football team

References

Under-21
European national under-21 association football teams